Mahforuz Mahalleh-ye Olya (also Romanized as Māhforūz Maḩalleh-ye ‘Olyā; also known as Māhforūz Maḩalleh, Māhforūz Maḩalleh-ye Bālā, and Māhforūz Maḩalleh-ye Pā’īn) is a village in Rudpey-ye Jonubi Rural District, in the Central District of Sari County, Mazandaran Province, Iran. At the 2006 census, its population was 598, in 156 families.

References 

Populated places in Sari County